John Bourne (born in or before 1508 –  died 1558) was an English politician.

He lived in Reading, Berkshire where he was constable in 1530, alderman in 1542 and mayor for 1544–45, 1552–53 and 1558–59. He was elected a Member (MP) of the Parliament of England for Reading in March 1553 and November 1554.

References

1558 deaths
Year of birth uncertain
English MPs 1553 (Edward VI)
English MPs 1554–1555
Members of the Parliament of England (pre-1707) for Reading
Mayors of Reading, Berkshire